The Rio de Janeiro Civil Police Museum is a historical museum in Rio de Janeiro, Brazil. It organizes and promotes permanent and temporary exhibitions of documents and items that portray the activities of Civil Police in the history of Rio de Janeiro since colonial times. It was founded in 1912 and was initially used only for the instruction of police academy students, but opened to the public in the 1930s. The museum is headquartered in a French eclectic style building constructed in 1910 by the architect Heitor de Mello. It is registered under the International Council of Museums as a scientific museum.

Collections

The museum is divided into collections related to:

the establishment of the police force and its history
uniformed police in the former federal capital
technical police
the former political police
initial communications
"forbidden games"
firearms and armament

The museum also contains materials confiscated from the fascist Brazilian Integralism movement; items related to the Nazi movement in Brazil, specifically flags, streamers, and "children's shoes with a swastika cross design"; and printed materials confiscated from the Brazilian Communist Party.

Museum Collection of Black Magic

The Museum Collection of Black Magic was formed at the Civil Police Museum in the 1920s to house religious objects related to Afro-Brazilian religions, specifically those of Candomblé and Umbanda traditions. The police were charged with the suppression of baixo espiritismo, or low spiritism under the revised penal code of the First Republic; anti-sorcery and witchcraft statutes were issued on 11 October 1890. Items were confiscated from Candomblé terreiros, which were viewed variously as disruptive, sinister, or grotesque. The terreiros were also viewed as sympathetic to Communism.

Mario de Andrade, the creator of SPHAN, now the National Institute of Historic and Artistic Heritage, added the collection to the initial list of national heritage monuments in 1938. As a result, the Museum Collection of Black Magic was the first protected ethnographic collection in Brazil.

The Museum Collection of Black Magic has not been exhibited to the public since 1999.

See also
 CORE (special operations)

References

External links
 Official website (in Portuguese)
 Civil Police Museum 

History museums in Brazil
Civil police of the states of Brazil
Law enforcement museums in South America
Museums in Rio de Janeiro (city)
National heritage sites of Rio de Janeiro (state)